Wagner may also refer to:

People 
 Wagner (surname), including a list of people
 Wagner (given name), a list of people
 Wágner, a given name and surname, including a list of people

Places

United States
 Wagner (community), Wisconsin, an unincorporated community
 Wagner, Montana, an unincorporated village
 Wagner, South Dakota, a city
 Wagner, Wisconsin, a town
 Wagner Township, Clayton County, Iowa
 Wagner Township, Aitkin County, Minnesota
 Wagner Lake, a lake in Minnesota

Canada
 Wagner, Alberta, a hamlet

Outer space
 Wagner (crater), on the planet Mercury
 3992 Wagner, a main-belt asteroid

Arts and entertainment

Fictional characters
 Wagner, in Christopher Marlowe's play Doctor Faustus, Goethe's Faust and Gounod's opera Faust
 Wagner, a shaman in the video game Fire Emblem: Fūin no Tsurugi
 Wagner, a dragon in the video game Odin Sphere
 Wagner, a pig in the Finnish comic strip Viivi & Wagner
 Kurt Wagner, a.k.a. Nightcrawler (comics), a character in the Marvel universe

Television
 Wagner (mini-series), a 1983 television series about Richard Wagner

Business
 Nestlé Wagner, a brand of frozen pizza
 Wagner Manufacturing Company, an American manufacturer of cast-iron and aluminum products, particularly cookware, from 1891 to 1952
 Wagner Motorcycle Company, an American motorcycle manufacturer from 1901 to 1914

Military uses
 , a destroyer escort
 Wagner Group, a Russian paramilitary organisation

Schools
 Wagner College, a private liberal arts college on Staten Island, New York City
 Wagner Graduate School of Public Service, New York University
 Karen Wagner High School, a high school in San Antonio, Texas
 W.P. Wagner High School, Edmonton, Alberta, Canada

See also
 Wagner Act, common name for the National Labor Relations Act, a 1935 U.S. labor law
 Wagner Seahawks, the athletic program of Wagner College
 Wagner's disease, familial eye disease of the connective tissue in the eye that causes blindness
 Wagner's law, an economic theory of development
 Richard Wagner (disambiguation)